Epiaeschna is a genus of darners in the dragonfly family Aeshnidae. There are about seven described species in Epiaeschna.

Species
These seven species belong to the genus Epiaeschna:
 Epiaeschna heros (Fabricius, 1798) (swamp darner)
 † Epiaeschna pseudoheros Nel & Petrulevicius, 2010
 † Epacantha magnifica (Martynov, 1929)
 † Epiaeschna stauropolitana Martynov, 1927
 † Mediaeschna lucida (Zhang, 1989)
 † Mediaeschna matutina (Zhang, 1989)
 † Triaeschna gossi (Campion, 1916)

References

Further reading

External links

 

Aeshnidae
Articles created by Qbugbot